Vilho Siivola (10 April 1910 – 28 November 1984) was a Finnish actor, film director, television director and a member of the Council of Theatre.

Siivola was born in Valkeakoski. His career included theatre, where he was both an actor and a director, motion pictures and television. Notably, in 1953 he was one of the founders of 'Kivi-juhlat’ (a theatre festival based in the childhood town of Aleksis Kivi) and was its first director in 1977. In addition he wrote two books, Myllykylästä Maailmalle (1975) and Maailmassa Maailmaa (1983). He died, aged 74, in Helsinki.

References

External links 

1910 births
1984 deaths
People from Valkeakoski
People from Häme Province (Grand Duchy of Finland)
Festival directors
Finnish film directors
Finnish television directors
Finnish theatre directors
20th-century Finnish male actors